Vinayak Sadashiv Wakaskar (born 16-2-1884) was a noted Maratha and Shivaji historian from Baroda.

Selected bibliography
91 Kalami Bakhar - Bhonsale Gharanyachi Chitravali, Venus Publications, 1930.
Krishnaji Anant Sabhasad Bakhar - Shri Shivprabhunche charitra, Venus Publications, 1960.

See also
List of Historians
List of historians by area of study
List of Marathi people
Chandraseniya Kayastha Prabhu

References

External links
 91 Kalami Bakhar - Bhonsale Gharanyachi Chitravali

Indian male writers
20th-century Indian historians
1884 births
Year of death missing
Marathi-language writers
History of Maharashtra